Yeonhui Cricket Ground is a cricket stadium in Incheon, South Korea built for Cricket at the 2014 Asian Games.

The 2014 Asian Games featured cricket for both the men's and the women's event and this ground was used for the cricket matches that were played in the games.

It has been reported that the crowd capacity of this ground is 3000. This was the first cricket stadium in South Korea.

In 2018, it hosted first ever T20I match between South Korea and China. 

In September 2019, it hosted Women's T20 East Asia Cup between South Korea, China, Hong Kong and Japan.

Women's Twenty20 International cricket

The stadium has hosted 11 Women's T20I matches to date.

See also
South Korea men's national cricket team
South Korea women's national cricket team
Korea Cricket Association
ICC East Asia-Pacific

References

Cricket grounds in South Korea
Venues of the 2014 Asian Games
Sport in Incheon